Qullqi Q'awa (Aymara qullqi silver, q'awa little river, ditch, crevice, fissure, gap in the earth, "silver brook" or "silver ravine", Hispanicized spelling Colqueccahua) is a  mountain in the Andes of Peru. It is situated in the Cusco Region, Espinar Province, in the west of the Condoroma District. Qullqi Q'awa lies near the border with the Puno Region, southwest of Sawanani Lake (Saguanani) and southeast of Chuqi Pirwa.

References

Mountains of Peru
Mountains of Cusco Region